Nils G. Walter, Dr. Ing., is the Francis S. Collins Collegiate Professor of Chemistry, Biophysics, and Biological Chemistry at the University of Michigan, Ann Arbor. Research in the Nils Walter Lab focuses on non-coding RNA through the lens of single molecule techniques. He is the Founding Director of the Single Molecule Analysis in real-Time (SMART) Center at Michigan. In addition, Walter is the Founding Co-Director for the University of Michigan Center for RNA Biomedicine whose mission is to enrich the university’s intellectual and training environment around RNA Biomedicine. He is currently an Associate Director for the Michigan Post-baccalaureate Research Education Program (PREP).

Education and early life 
Nils G. Walter was born in 1966 in Frankfurt am Main, Germany. He is a summa cum laude Dr. Ing. (PhD) graduate from the Technical University of Darmstadt and the Max-Planck-Institute for Biophysical Chemistry where he studied molecular in vitro evolution of DNA and RNA using fluorescence techniques with Nobel laureate Manfred Eigen. For his postdoctoral studies, he turned to RNA enzymes under the guidance of John M. Burke at the University of Vermont.

Career 
The Nils Walter Lab studies both non-coding RNA and protein-coding RNAs, and how the former control the gene expression of the latter, using tools from biophysics, biochemistry, cell biology, molecular biology and chemical biology. Most prominently, the lab uses leading-edge single molecule and super-resolution microscopy and single-molecule FRET approaches to probe the diverse functional mechanisms of transcriptional and translational riboswitches, the spliceosome, the RNA silencing and RNA interference machinery, ribozymes, as well as devices from DNA nanotechnology, in vitro and in live cells.

Walter is the author of more than 200 articles and numerous patents and disclosures of invention, including one on a new diagnostic single molecule counting approach termed SiMREPS that a startup company is currently working to commercialize. He has been invited to speak at over 180 speaking engagements and is the Principal Investigator of 19 current and past National Institutes of Health research grants and 31 private foundation grants (see Nils Walter Lab).

He currently serves or has served on numerous editorial boards including Methods, Wiley Interdisciplinary Reviews (WIRES), Biopolymers and the Journal of Biological Chemistry, as well as being a guest editor for Chemical Reviews, Encyclopedia of Biophysics, and Methods in Enzymology. Walter has received numerous honors including the Jean Dreyfus Boissevain Lectureship of Trinity University, the Harold R. Johnson Diversity Service Award, the Imes and Moore Faculty Award, and the Faculty Recognition Award of the University of Michigan. He has been elected an AAAS Fellow. Walter is a member of several professional organizations including the Society of German Chemists (GDCh),  (GBM), the RNA Society, the American Chemical Society, the American Association for the Advancement of Science, and the Biophysical Society.

So far, he has trained or is training 35 postdoctoral fellows and over 80 undergraduate students in his laboratory, whereas 30 scientists have received their PhD degrees under Walter, with more currently training to do so.

References

External links
 Nils Walter Lab
 Single Molecule Analysis in real-Time (SMART) Center at Michigan
 University of Michigan Center for RNA Biomedicine

21st-century American chemists
University of Michigan faculty
Fellows of the American Association for the Advancement of Science
1966 births
Living people